Cyclostrema smithi is a species of sea snail, a marine gastropod mollusk in the family Liotiidae.

Description
The height of the shell attains 2 mm.

Distribution
This species occurs in the Atlantic Ocean off the Azores and New Jersey, USA, at depths of 1100 m.

References

External links
 To Encyclopedia of Life
 To World Register of Marine Species

smithi
Gastropods described in 1897